Yazar is a Turkish masculine given name and surname. Notable people with the name include:

 Ceyhun Yazar (born 1992), Turkish footballer
 Gönül Yazar (born 1936), Turkish singer and actress
 Saffet Gurur Yazar (born 1987), Turkish footballer

Turkish masculine given names
Turkish-language surnames